Donald Martin Thomas, Baron Thomas of Gresford,  (born 13 March 1937) is a British Liberal Democrat politician.

Born the son of a Llangollen policeman, he was educated at Grove Park Grammar School, Wrexham, and at Peterhouse, Cambridge, he graduated with an LLB in Law and an MA in Classics. He practised as a solicitor in Wrexham from 1961 to 1966 before becoming a lecturer in law. He was called to the bar at Gray's Inn in 1967, and was appointed a QC in 1979. He became a deputy circuit judge in 1974, a Crown Court Recorder in 1976, and a Deputy High Court judge in 1995.

Having been appointed an Officer of the Order of the British Empire (OBE) in the 1982 Birthday Honours, Thomas was created a Life Peer as Baron Thomas of Gresford, of Gresford in the County Borough of Wrexham on 30 September 1996, whereupon he took the Liberal Democrat Whip. Since then he has been a spokesman on Wales and Home Affairs, and has sat on a number of committees. His political interests include Hong Kong, China, criminal justice, and Wales.

Thomas married Nan Kerr in 1961 with whom he had three sons and one daughter. She died in 2000. In 2005, he married fellow Liberal Democrat peer Baroness Walmsley. He and his wife are one of the few couples who both hold titles in their own right.

Lord Thomas was a vice-president of the Lloyd George Society until February 2012, when he was elected president.

Lord Thomas is the honorary chairman of the Association of Military Court Advocates.

Lord Thomas is the honorary president of the Hong Kong Welsh Male Voice Choir

References

Who's Who 2008

External links
Lord Thomas of Gresford profile at the site of Liberal Democrats
 Website of the Lloyd George Society

Thomas, Martin, Baron Thomas of Gresford
Thomas, Martin, Baron Thomas of Gresford
Thomas of Gresford
Thomas of Gresford
English Anglicans
Spouses of life peers
Thomas, Martin, Baron Thomas of Gresford
Members of Gray's Inn
Life peers created by Elizabeth II